The brown-backed honeyeater (Ramsayornis modestus) is a species of bird in the family Meliphagidae.
It is found in New Guinea and Cape York Peninsula.
Its natural habitat is subtropical or tropical mangrove forests.

References

brown-backed honeyeater
Birds of New Guinea
Birds of Cape York Peninsula
brown-backed honeyeater
brown-backed honeyeater
Taxonomy articles created by Polbot